Wilkinson is an unincorporated community in Wilkinson Township, Cass County, Minnesota, United States, near Cass Lake and Walker. It is located along State Highway 371 (MN 371) near 122nd Street NW.

References

Unincorporated communities in Cass County, Minnesota
Unincorporated communities in Minnesota